Lieutenant-Colonel Frank Frederick Alexander Heilgers (25 June 1892 – 16 January 1944) was a British Conservative Party Member of Parliament (MP) who was killed in a train crash during World War II.

Heilgers was from Bardwell in Suffolk and was educated at Magdalen College, Oxford.

He fought in World War I in Gallipoli, Egypt and Palestine, earning a mentioned in dispatches.

He was elected as MP for Bury St Edmunds at the 1931 general election. Heilgers was Parliamentary Private Secretary to the Minister of Agriculture from 1935 to 1936, to the Minister of Pensions from 1937 to 1940, and the First Commissioner of Works in 1939–40. He was awarded the Silver Medal of the RSPCA for promoting the passage of the Riding Establishment Act into Law, 1939.

Heilgers was made a JP for the county of Suffolk in 1923, and was an Alderman of West Suffolk County Council. He farmed over 1,000 acres in the county and was a breeder of British Friesian cattle and Large Black pigs.

He was recalled to the army on the outbreak of World War II in 1939 and served on the staff at home as Deputy Assistant Quartermaster General to 11 Corps in 1940 and at the War Office in 1942.

Heilgers, a Royal Artillery officer, was killed, aged 51, in the 1944 Ilford rail crash. He was laid to rest in Bardwell churchyard.

References

External links 
 

1944 deaths
People from Bardwell, Suffolk
Alumni of Magdalen College, Oxford
Royal Artillery officers
British Army personnel of World War I
British Army personnel of World War II
Conservative Party (UK) MPs for English constituencies
UK MPs 1931–1935
UK MPs 1935–1945
Members of West Suffolk County Council
Railway accident deaths in England
1892 births